Albano di Lucania is a town and comune in the province of Potenza, in the southern Italian region of Basilicata.

Main sights

The main sight in the town is the Mother Church of Santa Maria Maggiore (previously: chiesa Madonna della neve).

References

External links
 Pro Loco Tourist Association of Albano di Lucania

Cities and towns in Basilicata